The Eleventh Hour is the debut studio album by Scottish indie rock band The Birthday Suit, released on 11 November 2011 on Sing it Alone Records.

Background
In 2010 Idlewild entered an indefinite hiatus and so guitarist and backing vocalist Rod Jones subsequently formed The Birthday Suit in 2011 after writing material for his second album, Jones noted:

I started making a second solo record, then got sick of it. I began writing a set of completely new songs which turned out to have more of an indie rock sound, and it felt more like band material than solo stuff. Even though I wrote it by myself at home, it wouldn’t have been right to record it alone, so I got a small band together. The name of The Birthday Suit was sort of an in-joke that stuck.

They signed to Sing it Alone and released their debut single "Do You Ever?" as a free download, and in November 2011 they released The Eleventh Hour and followed its release with multiple performances in Glasgow and Edinburgh during the next year. The band performed at T in the Park and Wickerman Festival, and began working on a follow-up album.

Track listing

Personnel
Rod Jones
Jacqueline Irvine
David Jack
Steve Morrison
Séan McLaughlin
Catrin Pryce-Jones

References

2011 debut albums